Martin Rogan (born 1 May 1975) is a retired Irish professional boxer. He won the first televised Prize Fighter 2008 defeating 3 fighters on the same night taken the title winning £25,000. He held the Commonwealth heavyweight title in 2009 and challenged for the Irish heavyweight title in 2012 against Tyson Fury.

Boxing career

On 11 April 2008, Rogan won the Prizefighter series heavyweight competition on Sky Sports, beating David Dolan in the final by a unanimous decision after knocking his opponent down twice. He beat Alex Ibbs in the quarter-final by TKO and Dave Ferguson on points in the semi-final. On 15 May 2009 he lost to Sam Sexton.

Rogan was due to face Audley Harrison at Aston Villa Events Centre, Birmingham on 19 July 2008. However, the fight was delayed due to television schedules. The fight eventually took place on 6 December 2008, with Rogan defeating Harrison over ten rounds. The referee Ian John-Lewis scored the encounter 96–95.

On 28 February 2009, Rogan became the Commonwealth heavyweight champion in a fight of the year contender which could have gone either way against reigning champion Matt Skelton. During the fight the momentum see-sawed from one man to the other however Rogan prevailed in the brawl by beating Skelton with an 11th round stoppage by TKO.

Rogan's first defence of his Commonwealth heavyweight title against Sam Sexton, at the Odyssey, Belfast on 15 May 2009. Sexton defeated Rogan, handing him his first professional loss, after the doctor ruled that Rogan was unfit to continue in the 8th round due to a closed eye.

Rogan's rematch with Sam Sexton on 6 November 2009, once again at the Odyssey Arena in Belfast, ended in Rogan's corner pulling him out after the end of the sixth round due to a neck and arm injury.

Since the defeats to Sexton, Rogan took exactly a year before making a return to the ring after undergoing career-saving neck and spinal operations. He won two fights within two weeks against Yavor Marinchev and Werner Kreiskott in Ireland. Rogan was scheduled to fight Bulgarian boxer Kubrat Pulev for the European Heavyweight title but pulled out citing lack of preparation. The Pulev fight was originally rescheduled for November in Germany although Rogan was instead scheduled to fight former cruiserweight world title challenger Lewis Andreas Pineda for the vacant WBU World Heavyweight title on 27 October at the Odyssey Arena in Belfast., The fight with Pineda was cancelled after the British Boxing Board of Control refused to sanction it because of doubts over ownership of the WBU belt; two organizations were claiming jurisdiction over the title.

On 14 April 2012 Rogan fought Tyson Fury for the vacant Irish heavyweight title at the Odyssey Area in Belfast and lost via fifth-round TKO 

On 9 February 2013 Rogan returned to the ring, and winning ways, by outpointing the Czech Republic's Ladislav Kovarik over four rounds in at fight on the undercard of Carl Frampton's EBU (European) super bantamweight title challenge against Kiko Martinez.

Professional boxing record

{|class="wikitable" style="text-align:center; font-size:95%"
|-
!
!Result
!Record
!Opponent
!Type
!Round, time
!Date
!Location
!Notes
|-
|22
|Loss
|16-6
|align=left| Michael Sprott
|MD
|3
|4 Jun 2014
|align=left|
|align=left|
|-
|21
|Loss
|16-5
|align=left| Erkan Teper
|KO
|1 (10)
|16 Nov 2013
|align=left|
|
|-
|20
|Loss
|16-4
|align=left| Audley Harrison
|UD
|3
|23 Feb 2013
|align=left|
|align=left|
|-
|19
|Win
|16-3
|align=left| Albert Sosnowski
|TKO
|3 (3)
|23 Feb 2013
|align=left|
|align=left|
|-
|18
|Win
|15-3
|align=left| Ladislav Kovarik
|PTS
|4
|9 Feb 2013
|align=left|
|
|-
|17
|Loss
|14-3
|align=left| Tyson Fury
|TKO
|5 (12)
|14 Apr 2012
|align=left|
|align=left|
|-
|16
|Win
|14-2
|align=left| Werner Kreiskott
|Points
|6 (6)
|20 Nov 2010
|align=left|
|
|-
|15
|Win
|13-2
|align=left| Yavor Marinchev
|KO
|1 (6)
|6 Nov 2010
|align=left|
|
|-
|14
|Loss
|12-2
|align=left| Sam Sexton
|RTD
|6 (12)
|7 Nov 2009
|align=left|
|align=left|
|-
|13
|Loss
|12-1
|align=left| Sam Sexton
|TKO
|8 (12)
|15 May 2009
|align=left|
|align=left|
|-
|12
|Win
|12-0
|align=left| Matt Skelton
|TKO
|11 (12)
|28 Feb 2009
|align=left|
|align=left|
|-
|11
|Win
|11-0
|align=left| Audley Harrison
|PTS
|10
|6 Dec 2008
|align=left|
|
|-
|10
|Win
|10-0
|align=left| David Dolan
|UD
|3
|11 Apr 2008
|align=left|
|align=left|
|-
|9
|Win
|9-0
|align=left| Dave Ferguson
|UD
|3 
|11 Apr 2008
|align=left|
|align=left|
|-
|8
|Win
|8-0
|align=left| Alex Ibbs
|TKO
|2 (3)
|11 Apr 2008
|align=left|
|align=left|
|-
|7
|Win
|7-0
|align=left| Radcliffe Green
|TKO
|2 (6)
|13 Oct 2007
|align=left|
|
|-
|6
|Win
|6-0
|align=left| Jevgēņijs Stamburskis
|TKO
|3 (6)
|26 Oct 2006
|align=left|
|
|-
|5
|Win
|5-0
|align=left| Paul King
|PTS
|6
|7 Oct 2006
|align=left|
|
|-
|4
|Win
|4-0
|align=left| Darren Morgan
|PTS
|4
|20 May 2006
|align=left|
|
|-
|3
|Win
|3-0
|align=left| Tony Booth
|TKO
|2 (4)
|4 Jun 2005
|align=left|
|
|-
|2
|Win
|2-0
|align=left| Billy Bessey
|PTS
|4
|18 Mar 2005
|align=left|
|
|-
|1
|Win
|1-0
|align=left| Lee Mountford
|TKO
|1 (4)
|28 Oct 2004
|align=left|
|

References

External links

Official website

Heavyweight boxers
Boxers from Belfast
1971 births
Living people
Male boxers from Northern Ireland
Prizefighter contestants
Commonwealth Boxing Council champions